The Football Association of Serbia ( / ) is the governing body of football in Serbia, based in Belgrade. It organizes Serbian football leagues, namely the Serbian Superliga, the Serbia national football team, as well as the Second Leagues.

FSS was part of the Football Association of Yugoslavia, which was founded in 1919 in Zagreb then the new Football Association of Serbia and Montenegro in 2003. It was established as Football Association of Serbia in 2006 after the split of Montenegro and Serbia as two different independent countries. Javier Clemente was appointed the first coach of the Serbia national football team. The current head coach is Dragan Stojković.

Symbols
After receiving 150 proposals, in December 2006, the commission has decided to accept solution
submitted by the Belgrade architect Nikola Vujisić. Next to new Serbian Army symbols, Serbian Football Association has revived the smallest element of the Serbian Coat of arms. The white cross and 4 firesteelers are on a red background shield, with the golden frame and golden ball in the middle of the cross. Cyrillic name of the country (Србија) is above in white on golden background. The flag of the Serbian FA is blue, with the golden fringe for indoor use, and the new emblem in the middle.

Current champions

Current head coaches

Association presidents
 Zvezdan Terzić (July 2006–March 2008)
 Tomislav Karadžić (March 2008–May 2016)
 Slaviša Kokeza (May 2016–March 2021)
 Marko Pantelić (acting) (March 2021–May 2021)
 Nenad Bjeković (acting) (May 2021–Mar 2023)
 Dragan Džajić (Mar 2023–)

Current sponsorships
Puma - Official sponsor
Select Sport - Unofficial sponsor
Nektar pivo - Banjalučka pivara - Official sponsor
Telekom Srbija - Official sponsor
 Vujić Voda - Official sponsor
Lasta Beograd - Official sponsor
 Saobraćajni Institut CIP - Official sponsor
 EKO Serbia - Official sponsor

See also
 List of football clubs in Serbia
 Serbia national football team
 Serbia national under-21 football team
 Serbia national under-19 football team
 Serbian Superliga
 Serbian Cup
 Serbia national futsal team
 List of futsal clubs in Serbia

References

External links
Official website
FIFA Profile
UEFA Profile
Official website of Serbian national team supporters

Serbia
 
Futsal in Serbia
Sports governing bodies in Serbia
Sports organizations established in 2006
2006 establishments in Serbia